Eden and Return is a 1921 American silent comedy film directed by William A. Seiter and starring Doris May, Emmett King and Margaret Livingston.

Cast
 Doris May as Betty Baylock
 Emmett King as Robert Baylock
 Margaret Livingston as Connie Demarest
 Earl Metcalfe as John Grey
 Margaret Campbell as Aunt Sarah
 Charles A. Post as Sam Padgett 
 Frank Kingsley as Dempsey Chubbs

References

Bibliography
 Munden, Kenneth White. The American Film Institute Catalog of Motion Pictures Produced in the United States, Part 1. University of California Press, 1997.

External links
 

1921 films
1921 comedy films
1920s English-language films
American silent feature films
Silent American comedy films
American black-and-white films
Films directed by William A. Seiter
Film Booking Offices of America films
1920s American films